Andipalayam village belongs to Mamangalam Panchayat of Kattumannarkoil Taluk -Cuddalore District-Tamil Nadu, India

Agriculture and dairy products are the main productive activities. Paddy, sugarcane, and groundnuts are cultivated. Young people usually work in agriculture or abroad.

School - Up to 5th standard only (Government School)

Temple - Maariyamman koil, Pillaiyar Koil, Subramaniyan Koil.

The population of this temple -- Almost 2000 above (Electors -approximately 1200)

The literacy rate is 75 %. Women's is low.

Natural Water Resources: New lake (18 hectares)

Borewell --Almost 160 borewell services for farming.

Tractor -- Near 70 for farming

References

Villages in Cuddalore district